The Bentall Centre is a 1.5 million square foot office complex and underground shopping mall, located in Downtown Vancouver's financial district.  It is owned and managed by Hudson Pacific Properties. The shopping mall under the complex is known as "The Shops at Bentall Centre", and includes approximately 50 stores and a food court. The mall has a direct connection to Burrard Station of the SkyTrain network.

One Bentall Centre

One Bentall Centre is located at 505 Burrard Street. Completed in 1967, it stands at 86 m or 22 storeys tall.

Two Bentall Centre

Two Bentall Centre is located at 555 Burrard Street. Completed in 1969, it stands at 70 m or 18 storeys tall. WeWork is the main tenant of this building.

Three Bentall Centre
Three Bentall Centre is located at 595 Burrard Street. Completed in 1974, it stands at 122 m or 32 storeys tall. Bank of Montreal is the main tenant of this building.

Four Bentall Centre
Four Bentall Centre is located at 1055 Dunsmuir Street. Completed in 1981, it stands at 138 m or 35 storeys tall. It is currently the 12th tallest building in the city.

Five Bentall Centre
The building was constructed in two phases, with the first 22 floors completed by the end of 2002 and the 23rd to 35th floors completed in late 2007.

Tenants include: Macquarie Group, TECK, FM Global, Gowling WLG, Teekay, Harris & Company, Fasken and Hillcore Financial.

Bentall 5 was used as the Grey Enterprises building in the film Fifty Shades of Grey, filmed 2014.

Gallery

Accidents
On January 7, 1981, four carpenters – Donald Davis, Gunther Couvreux, Brian Stevenson and Yrjo Mitrunen – were killed while constructing Bentall Four. They were preparing a platform known as a 'fly form' (see formwork) for the last concrete pour on the roof, when it broke free. Without warning the fly form; known as 'fly form E', fell over the edge and carried the four men to their deaths. The news of this horrific accident shocked people across Canada and around the world.

On February 23, 1981, the Coroner's Inquest was held in Vancouver. It would be referred to as a marathon inquest, since it went into the eighth day with 30 witnesses being called upon to testify. Anthes Equipment Ltd was the company that designed and supplied the fly forms to the contractor building the tower. Anthes Equipment Ltd of Toronto was not registered to be working in BC at the time of the accident; leaving them liable to civil action. The equipment they supplied was also non-compliant with the specifications required in BC at the time.

One of the widows; Carol Davis, individually filed a writ on February 19, 1982, in the Supreme Court in an unprecedented action against Anthes Equipment Ltd. The other families elected to allow the Workers Compensation Board to sue on their behalf. On February 23, 1984; the fourth day into the trial, Carol Davis accepted an out-of-court settlement from Anthes Equipment Ltd.

See also
List of tallest buildings in Vancouver

References

External links
Bentall Centre
Bentall 5

Skyscrapers in Vancouver
Shopping malls in Metro Vancouver
Shopping malls established in 1967
Modernist architecture in Canada
Skyscraper office buildings in Canada
1967 establishments in British Columbia